The 2022–23 Futbol Club Barcelona season is the 123rd season in existence and the club's 92nd consecutive season in the top flight. In addition to the domestic league, Barcelona are participating in this season's editions of the Copa del Rey, the Supercopa de España, the UEFA Champions League (entering for the 19th consecutive season), and the UEFA Europa League. The season covers the period from 1 July 2022 to 30 June 2023.

This was the last season for Barcelona's defender Gerard Piqué, who retired before the winter World Cup. Piqué has spent 15 seasons with Barcelona and has won 30 official trophies with the club. This will be the first time not to feature him since 2007–08.

Kits
Supplier: Nike
Sponsor: Spotify (front) / UNHCR – UN Refugee Agency (back)

Season overview
On 10 June, Barcelona and Sergi Roberto negotiated a one year contract extension lasting until 30 June 2023. Two days later, Dani Alves announced that he would be leaving the club, when his contract expires at the end of June. On 30 June, Barcelona and Sixth Street reach an agreement for the acquisition of a 10% share of the club's La Liga TV rights, with Barcelona generating a total capital gain of €267 million for the current season. Sixth Street would initially invest €207.5 million and in return would receive 10% of the club's La Liga TV rights for the next 25 years.

On 1 July, Barcelona announced that Adama Traoré and Luuk de Jong would be leaving the club after completing their loan stint. Three days later, Barcelona announced the signing of Franck Kessié from A.C. Milan on a free transfer. Later that day, Barcelona announced the signing of Andreas Christensen from Chelsea on a free transfer. On 8 July, Barcelona and Tottenham Hotspur reached an agreement for the loan of Clément Lenglet for the rest of the season. On 12 July,  Barcelona and Watford reached an agreement for transfer of Rey Manaj for an undisclosed fee.

On 13 July, Barcelona played their first pre-season friendly versus Olot, which ended in a draw 1–1 from a poor Barcelona side. That day, Barcelona and Leeds United reached an agreement for transfer of young Raphinha for €48,000,000, with the fee potentially rising to €60,000,000. He signed a contract until 2027 with a buyout clause of €1 billion. Barcelona also reached an agreement with Sporting to loan Francisco Trincão for reported €3,000,000 until the end of the season with an option to buy. On 14 July, Barcelona and Ousmane Dembélé agreed a two years contract extension lasting until 30 June 2024 with a buyout clause of €100,000,000. Two days later, Barcelona and Bayern Munich reached an agreement for the transfer of Robert Lewandowski for €45,000,000, potentially rising to €50,000,000. He signed a four years contract until 2026 with a buyout clause of €500,000,000. Barcelona also announced the squad for the US tour, taking 28 players to play four pre-season matches there. On 19 July, Barcelona started the US tour with a 6–0 win over Inter Miami at DRV PNK Stadium in Fort Lauderdale, Florida.

Two days later, Barcelona sold an additional 15% of the club's La Liga TV right to Sixth Street. In total, Sixth Street would receive 25% of the club's La Liga TV rights for the next 25 years. On 23 July, Barcelona won their second game of the US tour 1–0 over Real Madrid at the Allegiant Stadium in Paradise, Nevada. Three days later, Barcelona drew Juventus 2–2 in Dallas, with Ousmane Dembélé scoring a brace. On 27 July, Barcelona reached a verbal agreement to sign french defenderJules Koundé from Sevilla. Two days later, Barcelona announced the signing of Koundé on a 5-year contract with a release clause of €1 billion. Barça also reached an agreement with Celta de Vigo for the transfer of Óscar Mingueza, which maintained a buy-back clause and a 50% cut of any future sale. In their final match of the US tour on 30 July, Barcelona defeated the New York Red Bulls 2–0 in Harrison, New Jersey, with Ousmane Dembele & Memphis Depay scoring.

On 1 August, Barcelona announced the activation of the third 'economic lever', selling 24.5% of Barça Studios to Socios.com for €100 million "to accelerate the club’s audiovisual, blockchain, NFT and Web.3 strategy".

Barcelona enjoyed a successful start to the league season, winning 12, drawing 1 and losing 1 of their first 14 games. However, their form was less impressive in the Champions League, and they dropped down to the Europa League for the second straight year.

On 3 November, Barca's legend & defender Gerard Pique announced his retirement from football by releasing a heartfelt video on his social media accounts and then played his final game for FC Barcelona just two days later against Almeria FC in front of his own fans at Spotify Camp Nou, having enjoyed a trophy-laden 14 years at the club since returning from Manchester United in 2008 in which he played 615 games for the team.

On 3 January 2023, Inaki Peña was registered as a first team player, and was handed the number 13 shirt left vacant by Neto, who had left for AFC Bournemouth.

March

On 5 March, Barcelona defeated Valencia 1–0, getting their 20th win of the season in La Liga. Raphinha scored the only goal of the match, extending the team's lead at the top of the league table to 9 points. Ferran Torres also missed a penalty in the 55th minute and in the 59th minute, Ronald Araújo got sent-off after committing a last-man foul, for which he will be suspended for the next league match against Athletic Bilbao.

On 12 March, Barcelona beat Athletic Bilbao 1–0 away, with Raphinha scoring the only goal of the match. The win helped keep the 9 point lead at the top of the table ahead of the El Clásico. This was Barcelona's 19th clean sheet in the league in which they have conceded only eight goals in 25 matches, breaking the record for fewest goals conceded after 25 matches, held jointly by Deportivo La Coruña in the 1993–94 season and Atlético Madrid in the 1990–91 season, both teams conceding 10 goals in 25 games.

On 19 March, Barcelona defeated Real Madrid 2–1 in the El Clásico. This win put the team 12 points in front at the top of the table and was also Barcelona's 100th competitive El Clásico win and third consecutive win against Real Madrid across all competitions. Franck Kessié scored the winning goal in the 92nd minute, aside from getting the team closer to winning the league title, the goal had another special significance as it was Barcelona's 3,000th goal scored in La Liga at the Camp Nou.

Players

First team

|-
!colspan="12" style="background:#26559B; color:#FFF000; " | Goalkeepers
|-

|-
!colspan="12" style="background:#26559B; color:#FFF000; " | Defenders
|-

|-
!colspan="12" style="background:#26559B; color:#FFF000; " |  Midfielders
|-

|-
!colspan="12" style="background:#26559B; color:#FFF000; " |  Forwards
|-

Reserve team (From Barcelona Atlètic and Barcelona Juvenil)

Transfers

In

Out

Loans out

Transfer summary
Undisclosed fees are not included in the transfer totals.

Expenditure
Summer:  €158,000,000

Winter:  €00,000,000

Total:  €158,000,000

Income
Summer:  €40,000,000

Winter:  €0,000,000

Total:  €40,000,000

Net totals
Summer:  €118,000,000

Winter:  €0,000,000

Total:  €118,000,000

Pre-season and friendlies

Competitions

Overall record

La Liga

League table

Results summary

Results by round

Matches
The league fixtures were announced on 23 June 2022.

Copa del Rey

Supercopa de España

UEFA Champions League

Group stage 

The draw for the group stage was held on 25 August 2022.

UEFA Europa League

Knockout phase

Knockout round play-offs
The draw for the knockout round play-offs was held on 7 November 2022.

Statistics

Squad statistics

|-
!colspan=16 style="background:#26559B; color:#FFF000; "|Goalkeepers

|-
!colspan=16 style="background:#26559B; color:#FFF000; "|Defenders

|-
!colspan=16 style="background:#26559B; color:#FFF000; "|Midfielders

|-
!colspan=16 style="background:#26559B; color:#FFF000; "|Forwards

|-
! colspan=16 style="background:#26559B; color:#FFF000; " text-align:center| Players who left during the season but made an appearance

|-
!colspan=16 style="background:#26559B; color:#FFF000; "|Own goals (3)
|}

Goalscorers

Hat-tricks

(H) – Home; (A) – Away

Assists

Cleansheets

Disciplinary record

{| class="wikitable" style="text-align:center;width:90%;"
|-
! rowspan=2 style="background:#26559B; color:#FFF000; " width=15| 
! rowspan=2 style="background:#26559B; color:#FFF000; " width=15| 
! rowspan=2 style="background:#26559B; color:#FFF000; " width=15| 
! rowspan=2 style="background:#26559B; color:#FFF000; " width=160| Name
! colspan=3 style="background:#26559B; color:#FFF000; " width=120| 
! colspan=3 style="background:#26559B; color:#FFF000; " width=120| 
! colspan=3 style="background:#26559B; color:#FFF000; " width=150| 
! colspan=3 style="background:#26559B; color:#FFF000; " width=140| 
! colspan=3 style="background:#26559B; color:#FFF000; " width=120| 
! colspan=3 style="background:#26559B; color:#FFF000; " width=120| Total
|-
! style="background:#26559B; color:#FFF000; " width=35| 
! style="background:#26559B; color:#FFF000; " width=35| 
! style="background:#26559B; color:#FFF000; " width=35| 
! style="background:#26559B; color:#FFF000; " width=35| 
! style="background:#26559B; color:#FFF000; " width=35| 
! style="background:#26559B; color:#FFF000; " width=35| 
! style="background:#26559B; color:#FFF000; " width=35| 
! style="background:#26559B; color:#FFF000; " width=35| 
! style="background:#26559B; color:#FFF000; " width=35| 
! style="background:#26559B; color:#FFF000; " width=35| 
! style="background:#26559B; color:#FFF000; " width=35| 
! style="background:#26559B; color:#FFF000; " width=35| 
! style="background:#26559B; color:#FFF000; " width=35| 
! style="background:#26559B; color:#FFF000; " width=35| 
! style="background:#26559B; color:#FFF000; " width=35| 
! style="background:#26559B; color:#FFF000; " width=35| 
! style="background:#26559B; color:#FFF000; " width=35| 
! style="background:#26559B; color:#FFF000; " width=35| 
|-
| 5
| MF
| 
|align=left| Sergio Busquets
||6||1|| ||1|| || || || || ||3|| || ||1|| || ||11||1||
|-
| 6
| MF
| 
|align=left| Gavi
||5|| || ||1|| || || || || ||2|| || ||1|| || ||9|| ||
|-
| 22
| FW
| 
|align=left| Raphinha
||6|| || ||1|| || ||1|| || || || || || || || ||8|| ||
|-
| 19
| MF
| 
|align=left| Franck Kessié
||4|| || ||1|| || || || || || || || ||1|| || ||6|| ||
|-
| 4
| DF
| 
|align=left| Ronald Araújo
||4|| ||1|| || || ||1|| || || || || || || || ||5|| ||1
|-
| 11
| FW
| 
|align=left| Ferran Torres
||4|| ||1|| || || || || || ||1|| || || || || ||5|| ||1
|-
| 18
| DF
| 
|align=left| Jordi Alba
||4||1|| || || || || || || || || || ||1|| || ||5||1||
|-
| 7
| FW
| 
|align=left| Ousmane Dembélé
||4|| || || || || || || || ||1|| || || || || ||5|| ||
|-
| 20
| DF
| 
|align=left| Sergi Roberto
||3|| || || || || ||1|| || ||1|| || || || || ||5|| ||
|-
| 9
| FW
| 
|align=left| Robert Lewandowski
||2||1|| || || || || || || || || || ||1|| || ||3||1||
|-
| 24
| DF
| 
|align=left| Eric García
||3|| || || || || || || || || || || || || || ||3|| ||
|-
| 15
| DF
| 
|align=left| Andreas Christensen
||2|| || || || || ||1|| || || || || || || || ||3|| ||
|-
| 8
| MF
| 
|align=left| Pedri
||2|| || ||1|| || || || || || || || || || || ||3|| ||
|-
| 28
| DF
| 
|align=left| Alejandro Balde
||3|| || || || || || || || || || || || || || ||3|| ||
|-
| 10
| FW
| 
|align=left| Ansu Fati
||3|| || || || || || || || || || || || || || ||3|| ||
|-
| 3
| DF
| 
|align=left| Gerard Piqué
||2|| ||1|| || || || || || || || || || || || ||2|| ||1
|-
| 21
| MF
| 
|align=left| Frenkie de Jong
||2|| || || || || || || || || || || || || || ||2|| ||
|-
| 32
| MF
| 
|align=left| Pablo Torre
|| || || ||1|| || || || || ||1|| || || || || ||2|| ||
|-
| 17
| DF
| 
|align=left| Marcos Alonso
||1|| || || || || || || || || || || || || || ||1|| ||
|-
| 23
| DF
| 
|align=left| Jules Koundé
||1|| || || || || || || || || || || || || || ||1|| ||
|-
! style="background:#26559B; color:#FFF000; "; colspan=2|Coach
| 
|align=left| Xavi
||5|| || ||1|| || || || || ||1|| || || || || ||7|| ||
|-
! style="background:#26559B; color:#FFF000; "; colspan=4|  Totals
!66||3||3||7|| || ||4|| || ||10|| || ||5|| || ||92||3||3

Injury record
{| class="wikitable" style="text-align:center"
|-
! style="background:#26559B; color:#FFF000; " width=30|
! style="background:#26559B; color:#FFF000; " width=30|
! style="background:#26559B; color:#FFF000; " width=30|
! style="background:#26559B; color:#FFF000; " width=140|Name
! style="background:#26559B; color:#FFF000; " width=290|
! style="background:#26559B; color:#FFF000; " width=70|
! style="background:#26559B; color:#FFF000; " width=70|
! style="background:#26559B; color:#FFF000; " width=170|
! style="background:#26559B; color:#FFF000; " width=130|
! style="background:#26559B; color:#FFF000; " width=130|
|-
| 19
| FW
| 
| align=left|Ferran Torres
| Right foot cut
| 
| FCB.com
| in training
| 11 July 2022
| 12 August 2022
|-
| 23
| DF
| 
| align=left|Jules Koundé
| Left hamstring injury
| 
| FCB.com
| vs Austria with France
| 22 September 2022
| 13 October 2022
|-
| 21
| MF
| 
| align=left|Frenkie de Jong
| Left thigh injury
| 
| FCB.com
| vs Poland with Netherlands
| 22 September 2022
| 8 October 2022
|-
| 14
| FW
| 
| align=left|Memphis Depay
| Left thigh injury
| 
| FCB.com
| vs Poland with Netherlands
| 22 September 2022
| 20 November 2022
|-
| 4
| DF
| 
| align=left|Ronald Araújo
| Right thigh injury — (surgery)
| 
| FCB.com
| vs Iran with Uruguay
| 23 September 2022
| 30 November 2022
|-
| 2
| DF
| 
| align=left|Héctor Bellerín
| Left soleus muscle
| 
| FCB.com
| in training
| 27 September 2022
| 19 October 2022
|-
| 15
| DF
| 
| align=left| Andreas Christensen
| Sprained ankle
| 
| FCB.com
|  vs Inter Milan
| 4 October 2022
| 3 November 2022
|-
| 19
| MF
| 
| align=left| Franck Kessié
| Adductor muscle injury
| 
| FCB.com
|  in training
| 5 October 2022
| 11 October 2022
|-
| 20
| MF
| 
| align=left|Sergi Roberto
| Dislocated left shoulder
| 
| FCB.com
| vs Athletic Bilbao
| 23 October 2022
| 5 December 2022
|-
| 24
| DF
| 
| align=left|Eric García
| External obturator muscle strain
| 
| rowspan=2| FCB.com
| rowspan=2|vs Valencia
| rowspan=2| 29 October 2022
| 3 November 2022
|-
| 23
| DF
| 
| align=left|Jules Koundé
| Biceps femoris muscle strain
| 
| 14 November 2022
|-
| 19
| MF
| 
| align=left| Franck Kessié
| Biceps femoris muscle strain
| 
| FCB.com
| vs Viktoria Plzeň
| 1 November 2022
| 14 December 2022
|-
| 7
| FW
| 
| align=left|Ousmane Dembélé
| Rectus femoris strain — left thigh
| 
| FCB.com
| vs Girona
| 28 January 2023
| April 2023
|-
| 5
| MF
| 
| align=left| Sergio Busquets
| Sprained ankle — left ankle
| 
| FCB.com
|  vs Sevilla
| 5 February 2023
| 20 February 2023
|-
| 8
| MF
| 
| align=left| Pedri
| Rectus femoris muscle injury — right thigh
| 
| FCB.com
|  vs Manchester United
| 16 February 2023
| April 2023
|-
| 10
| FW
| 
| align=left|Ansu Fati
| Bruised knee
| 
| FCB.com
| in training
| 24 February 2023
| 1 March 2023
|-
| 9
| FW
| 
| align=left|Robert Lewandowski
| Hamstring strain
| 
| FCB.com
| vs Almería
| 26 February 2023
| 11 March 2023
|-
| 4
| DF
| 
| align=left|Ronald Araújo
| Groin adductor muscle strain — left thigh
| 
| FCB.com
| vs Real Madrid
| 19 March 2023
| April 2023
|-

Awards

References

FC Barcelona seasons
Barcelona
Barcelona
2023 in Catalonia